Clifton Road was a railway station built by the Lancashire and Yorkshire Railway to serve the village of Clifton north east of Brighouse in West Yorkshire, England.

History 

Opened by the Lancashire and Yorkshire Railway in 1881 and closed in 1931.  The line continued in use until subsidence caused the closure of the line in 1952.

References  

 

Disused railway stations in Calderdale
Former Lancashire and Yorkshire Railway stations
Railway stations in Great Britain opened in 1881
Railway stations in Great Britain closed in 1931
1881 establishments in England